Herman Nieweg (April 13, 1932 in Steenwijkerwold – May 28, 1999 in Portugal) was a Dutch sculptor and ceramist.

Life and work 
Nieweg studied interior design at the Academy of Fine Arts in Rotterdam. His teacher Frieda Koch brought him into contact with ceramics. As an artist Nieweg is autodidact.

From the 1960s to the 1980s Nieweg lived and worked in Giethoorn, where he ran his own pottery studio. In the 1990s he moved to Monchique in Portugal, where he built several large ovens. He died a few years later at the age of 67.

Much of Nieweg's work was done in ceramics, examples are the reliefs he made for Zwolle and Heino.

Works 
 1973, image 3 Columns with bird with children in Assen
 1980, embossed on the city wall of Zwolle.
 1982, relief on facade of the town in Heino

See also 
 List of Dutch sculptors
 List of Dutch ceramists

References

External links 

  Nieweg, Herman at capriolus.nl

1932 births
1999 deaths
Dutch ceramists
Dutch sculptors
Dutch male sculptors
People from Steenwijkerland
20th-century ceramists